Mermoz-Sacré-Cœur is a commune d'arrondissement of the city of Dakar, Senegal. It is located on the western coast of the Cap-Vert peninsula. As of 2013, it had a population of 29,798.

Geography
Mermoz borders the Atlantic Ocean to the west.  It also borders Ouakam to the north, Fann-Point E-Amitié to the south, and Sicap-Liberté to the northeast.

History
The neighborhood is named after Jean Mermoz, a French pilot.

Religion
There many mosques throughout the neighborhood. These include Grande mosquée de Mermoz, Mermoz Rawane Mbaye, Sacré-Cœur 3, Sacré-Cœur VDN, and Sicap Karak.

Economy
The headquarters for Sonatel, a telephone company is located in the Cité Keur Gorgui neighborhood within Mermoz-Sacré-Cœur. Dakar Dem Dikk, a public transit company, is also based out of Mermoz-Sacré-Cœur.

Sports
The AS Dakar Sacré-Cœur Football club is based out of Mermoz-Sacré-Cœur.

Images

References

Arrondissements of Dakar